Gary Alan Bugenhagen (born February 6, 1945) is a former professional American football offensive lineman in the American Football League (AFL) and in the National Football League (NFL). He was the 4th round draft pick (#102 overall) of the Buffalo Bills in the 1967 NFL Draft, playing offensive tackle there in 1967 and also playing with the Boston Patriots in 1970. He also played with Indianapolis Capitols of the Continental Football League. Bugenhagen served in the United States Air Force during the Vietnam War.

References

1945 births
Living people
Players of American football from Buffalo, New York
American football offensive tackles
Syracuse Orange football players
Buffalo Bills players
Boston Patriots players
Continental Football League players
American Football League players
United States Air Force personnel of the Vietnam War
New York National Guard personnel